The Minister of Reconstruction was a British government post that briefly existed during the latter stages of the Second World War, charged with planning for the post-war period. A succession of government committees had failed to make much progress with the problems arising out of reconstruction and so in 1943 Winston Churchill took the bold step of appointing a single minister as a member of the War Cabinet.

Minister of Reconstruction (1917–19??)

Minister of Reconstruction (1943–1945)
Colour key (for political parties):

See also
Ministry of Reconstruction

Reconstruction
1940s in the United Kingdom
1943 establishments in the United Kingdom
1945 disestablishments in the United Kingdom
Defunct ministerial offices in the United Kingdom
United Kingdom home front during World War II